Paisin (also, Pagnines, Pagosines, Pagsin, Paycines, and Paysim) is a former Kalindaruk (Costanoan) settlement in Monterey County, California. 

Paisin was near  Monterey Bay, but its precise location is unknown.

References

See also
Native American history of California

Costanoan populated places
Former Native American populated places in California
Former settlements in Monterey County, California